GK Sanghar is a Singaporean entertainment news personality of Indian descent. She is a television presenter, writer and voice-over artist. Born to parents from Malaysia and Singapore respectively, she has resided in many countries since the age of 6. She was raised as a modern Sikh and speaks over 5 languages including Hindi, Punjabi, Malay and Basic Mandarin. Sanghar is popularly known for her work on Zee TV and Toggle TV under the umbrella of MediaCorp.

Career
After graduating from Monash University with a B.A. in Journalism and Communications, her career in the media industry began with Australia's women's lifestyle publication, Cleo. Whilst writing, she tried a hand at emceeing and nabbed the opportunity to host a widely publicized press launch for Singapore's first international music album release, Illamai Jolly Jolly produced by Ashok's Joy Entertainment in association with Shisha Productions. The album featured the voices of child artistes from across the globe, alongside popular singers Kavita Krishnamurthy and Usha Uthup.

Sanghar continued to write for a variety of publications, including NRI magazine, India Se and the prominent American Chronicle.

She subsequently channelled into television, having written and hosted countless TV programs on Zee TV such as 'Pure Allure', 'Style Mart' and the 'I20 Super Challenge Cricket OLAM Cup', interviewing renowned Indian celebrities such as Bhupendra Kumar Modi and Sunil Gavaskar. Sanghar hosted Singapore's first 6-part reality series titled 'My First Million Dollar'. The program aired on Starhub TV and was featured across 18 countries. Her more recent ventures include the culinary programs titled, Aunty’s Kitchen and Grill Please!.

Apart from her journalistic ventures, Sanghar hosts a series of speech therapy and public-speaking workshops for young students in Singapore. She also takes part in community awareness campaigns that focus on matters close to her heart, and has reported live on stories concerning the social welfare of local minority groups, including the rehabilitation of ex-convicts through the Yellow Ribbon Project.

Sanghar is the face of a designer boutique, 'Indochine with Gaurika', which was first officially launched in 2010 by the CEO and Editor-in-Chief for India Se, Shobha Tsering Bhalla in Singapore. Sanghar has undergone training at the New York Acting Academy and the Bollywood Dance Academy. She is currently undergoing rehabilitation following a serious rock-climbing injury.

Filmography

Publications

References

External links
 
 GK Sanghar at Indochine with Gaurika
 India Se
 Trailers on 'Production' Page at Video Houze Pte Ltd
 Show Clip at Aunty's Kitchen
 Show Clip at Grill Please!

Singaporean people of Indian descent
Singaporean people of Punjabi descent
Singaporean Sikhs
Singaporean women television presenters
Singaporean journalists
Monash University alumni
Living people
Year of birth missing (living people)
Singaporean women journalists